The New Latin name Nova Zeelandia honoured the Dutch coastal province of Zeeland ("sea-land"). Representatives of the Netherlands' colonial enterprises bestowed this name on:

 the Essequibo River colony, founded by Zeelanders in 1616 in present-day Guyana
 present-day New Zealand, visited by Abel Tasman in 1642–1643; later sometimes re-Latinised as Nova Zealandia

Maritime history of the Dutch East India Company
Early modern Netherlandish cartography